Captain John Frederick Ireland (12 August 1888 – 16 October 1970) was an English amateur cricketer. Ireland was a right-handed batsman who bowled right-arm  roundarm medium pace.

Cricket
Ireland played cricket at Marlborough College where he was educated, captaining the Marlborough side in 1907. He played for Cambridge University between 1908 and 1911, making 28 first-class appearances  in total, 27 for the University and one for MCC in 1912. He also played Minor Counties cricket for Suffolk between 1906 and 1911.

A three-sport athlete, Ireland played cricket, hockey and golf while attending Trinity College, winning blues in his freshman year in both cricket and hockey.

Ireland's uncle, Frederick Schomberg Ireland, also played cricket and made four first-class appearances between 1878–1887. Ireland's brother-in-law, Eric Norman Spencer Crankshaw, made one first-class appearance in 1909.

Life
Ireland was born 12 August 1888 in Port Louis, Mauritius, the second son of George Hugh Ireland of Ireland Fraser & Co., Mauritius and his first wife, Margaret Guthrie Harvey, the daughter of John Harvey of Kent and Singapore. He was the grandson of George Ireland, one of the founders of Ireland Fraser & Co., and the great-grandson of Walter Foggo Ireland, a Church of Scotland minister at the North Leith Parish Church within the Presbytery of Edinburgh.

During WWI, Ireland was a Captain in the Royal Field Artillery deployed in France.

Ireland married Philippa Sarah Bates, the daughter of Philip Bates, on 18 December 1917 at Holy Trinity Church, Upper Chelsea.

Professionally, Ireland was a director for both Arbuthnot Latham & Co. and Mercantile Bank of India.

Ireland died on 21 October 1970 at Uckfield in Sussex, England.

References

External links

1888 births
1970 deaths
People from Port Louis District
English cricketers
Suffolk cricketers
Cambridge University cricketers
Marylebone Cricket Club cricketers
British Army personnel of World War I
Royal Field Artillery officers
British people in British Mauritius